Clarksville Cave is a cave in Clarksville, Albany County, New York.

History
The history of Clarksville Cave is one of the longest of any cave in New York. The earliest known petroglyph found in the cave is from 1811, and a letter describing the cave was written by Teunis Houghtaling in 1818.

References

External links
 Northeastern Cave Conservancy Entry on Clarksville Cave
 Clarksville Cave Management Plan

Caves of New York (state)
Landforms of Albany County, New York
Tourist attractions in Albany County, New York